Zebra stripes describe the stripes of a zebra.

Zebra stripe or zebra striping may also refer to:

 Zebra striping (computer graphics), a diagnostic shading technique used in computer graphics
 Zebra stripe (videography), a feature on some video cameras to aid in correct exposure
 Zebra stripes, a characteristic of some immersion burns
 One of the possible Primitive markings of horses and other equids
 Zebra print, an animal print that resembles the pattern of the skin and fur of a zebra
 Zebra crossing, a type of pedestrian crossing involving black-and-white stripes
 Zebra strip, an elastomeric connector with an alternating black-and-white stripe pattern

See also
 Stripe (disambiguation)
 Zebra (disambiguation)
 The Zebra-Striped Hearse, a 1962 mystery novel by Ross McDonald